To tow something is to pull it using a line or chain.

Tow or TOW may also refer to:

Places 
 Tow, Iran, Razavi Khorasan Province
 Tow, Texas, United States
 Tow Bay, South Sandwich Islands, south Atlantic
 Tow Hill, a volcanic plug in British Columbia, Canada

People
 Tow (surname), a Chinese, English, or Scottish family name, and a list of people so named

Other uses 
 Tow (fibre), a textiles by-product
 Tug of war, a sport
 BGM-71 TOW, an anti-tank missile
 tow, the Jemez language of North America, by ISO 639-3 code

See also
 Maximum takeoff weight, abbreviated MTOW